The Diamond Chair is a chair designed by Harry Bertoia in 1952.

Diamond chair is made with welded steel with rods in polished or satin chrome, or bonded rilsan, a very durable adhesive-fused nylon-dipped finish. Scratch, chip, and chemical resistant. All wire seating includes glides. Cushions are secured to chair with lock-snaps. Full covers are stretched over the wire seat basket and attach to seat basket with hooks.

Bertoia said about the chairs: "They are mainly made of air, like sculpture. Space passes right through them."

Bibliography 

Chairs
Individual models of furniture